Paul Goldberger (born in 1950) is an American author, architecture critic and lecturer. He is known for his "Sky Line" column in The New Yorker.

Biography
Shortly after starting as a reporter at The New York Times in 1972, he was assigned to write the obituary of architect Louis Kahn, who had died suddenly of a heart attack in a bathroom in New York's Pennsylvania Station. The next year, he was named an architecture critic, working alongside Ada Louise Huxtable until 1982.

In 1984, Goldberger won the Pulitzer Prize for his architecture criticism in The Times. In 1996, New York City mayor Rudolph Giuliani presented him with the city's Preservation Achievement Award in recognition of the impact of his work on historic preservation.

From July 2004 until June 2006, he served as the Dean of Parsons The New School for Design, the art and design college of The New School. He remains the Joseph Urban Professor of Design at the institution.

He is the author of the book Up from Zero: Politics, Architecture, and the Rebuilding of New York and The City Observed, New York, a Guide to the Architecture of Manhattan. Also, in a May 2005 New Yorker column, he suggested that the best solution for rebuilding at Ground Zero would focus on residential use mixed with cultural and memorial elements.

A resident of the Upper West Side of Manhattan, Goldberger is married to Susan Solomon and has three sons, Adam, Ben and Alex.  He is a 1972 graduate of Yale University, where he studied architectural history under Vincent Scully.

Works

Books
 Up from Zero: Politics, Architecture, and the Rebuilding of New York.
 The City Observed, New York, a Guide to the Architecture of Manhattan.
 Why Architecture Matters (2009). Yale University Press, .
 Building Up and Tearing Down: Reflections on the Age of Architecture (2009). The Monacelli Press, .
 Building Art: The Life and Work of Frank Gehry (2015). Knopf 
 Ballpark: Baseball in the American City (2019). Knopf Doubleday Publishing Group, ISBN 0-307-70154-9

Articles
 Reports on a joint lecture by Harold Varmus and his son Jacob Varmus.

References

External links
Goldberger's personal website bio
 

American architecture critics
American male non-fiction writers
1950 births
Living people
The New Yorker people
The New Yorker critics
The New York Times Pulitzer Prize winners
Pulitzer Prize for Criticism winners
Parsons School of Design faculty
Yale School of Architecture alumni
Nutley High School alumni
People from Nutley, New Jersey
Writers from Passaic, New Jersey
20th-century American journalists
American male journalists
21st-century American journalists
Vanity Fair (magazine) people